Let's Start a Beat – Live from Cavestomp is a live album released by The Monks. It was recorded in 1999, 33 years after their only album Black Monk Time was released, and at their first-ever gig on home turf. Cavestomp was an annual event in New York City that reunited mid-sixties bands for a weekend of live music. Released in 2000 on Cavestomp Records.  It was reissued in 2001 by Munster Records.

Track listing 
All songs written by Burger/Clark/Shaw/Day/Johnston

Enhanced CD content
Live performance video of "Complication", "Cuckoo" and "Shut Up"
Trailer for Monks: The Transatlantic Feedback, a documentary on the Monks

Personnel
All lead vocals by Gary Burger except *lead vocal by Roger Johnston; **lead vocal by Dave Day & Eddie Shaw; ***lead vocal by Mike Fornatale
Gary Burger – lead vocals and guitar
Larry Clark – organ and vocals
Dave Day – banjo and vocals
Roger Johnston – drums and vocals
Eddie Shaw – bass and vocals

Release history

References 

The Monks albums
2000 live albums